Magyarfalu (meaning "Hungarian village") may refer to:

Hungarian name of Záhorská Ves, a village in Slovakia
Hungarian name of Uhorská Ves, a village in Slovakia
Hungarian name of Arini, a Csángó Hungarian village in Găiceana Commune, Bacău County, Romania